Bandera cupidinella is a species of snout moth in the genus Bandera. It was described by George Duryea Hulst in 1888, and is known from the United States, including Colorado and New Mexico.

References

Phycitinae
Moths described in 1888